General Lincoln may refer to:

Benjamin Lincoln (1733–1810), Continental Army major general
Pamela J. Lincoln (fl. 1980s–2020s), U.S. Air Force major general
Rush B. Lincoln Jr. (1910–2002), U.S. Army major general